PX Mart is a supermarket chain in Taiwan. As of October 2021, PX Mart operates 1,056 stores across the island, making it the largest supermarket chain in Taiwan and the second largest retailer by revenue behind 7-Eleven. The corporate headquarters is located in Zhongshan District, Taipei.

History
In 1974, the Ministry of the Interior founded the Jūngōngjiào Fúlì Zhōngxīn (軍公教福利中心), a supermarket with cheaper prices and no sales tax whose access is restricted to military, civil servants, and educators. In 1989, the supermarket was reorganized to create Quánliánshè (全聯社) that catered to civil servants and educators; the military maintained its own supermarket, which still exists to this day. In 1998, several executives were found to have embezzled money. Nine people were charged, but were all eventually found not guilty. During the controversy, the company was privatized and headed by Lin Ming-Hsiung, founder of Yuanlih Construction (元利建設); its 66 stores were rebranded as PX Mart and were opened to the public. 

The supermarket operated as a discount store and kept consumer prices down through unconventional strategies, such as opening smaller stores in discreet locations or outside urban areas, and not accepting card payments to avoid processing fees. In 2006, PX Mart launched its long-running advertising campaign known as "Mister PX Mart" (全聯先生), which features a man in a deadpan voice describing the chain's lack of extra services to achieve low prices.

In 2012, PX Mart surpassed Carrefour as the largest supermarket chain in Taiwan. In 2013, PX Mart reversed its cash-only policy by allowing card payments from CTBC Bank. PX Mart then acquired two more supermarket chains:  in 2014, and Matsusei in 2015. In 2021, PX Mart announced its acquisition of the hypermarket chain RT-Mart; the deal is awaiting regulatory approval.

Operations 

PX Mart operates three warehouses, located in Guanyin, Taoyuan; Wuqi, Taichung; and Gangshan, Kaohsiung.

Notes

See also
 Post exchange

References

External links

 

Companies based in Taipei
Retail companies of Taiwan
Supermarkets of Taiwan
Taiwanese companies established in 1998
Retail companies established in 1998